Teran may refer to:
Teran grape, Croatian red grape variety and wine
Teran, Slovene name for Terrano (grape) of the Refosco grape family
Teran, battled the Sea Mither in Orkney legend

See also
Tehran (disambiguation)
Terán (disambiguation)